Malkhed  originally known as Manyakheta (IAST: Mānyakheṭa, Prakrit: "Mannakheḍa"), and also known as Malkhed, is a town in Karnataka, India. It is located on the banks of Kagina river in Sedam Taluk of Kalaburagi district, around 40 km from Kalaburagi.

The city reached the peak of its prosperity during the 9th and 10th centuries, serving as the capital of the expansionist Rashtrakuta dynasty, which united almost all of the Deccan. At Manyakheta, there is a historical fort whose restoration is in progress based on a proposal submitted by HKADB (Hyderabad Karnataka Area Development Board).

Demographics
 India census, Malkheda had a population of 11,180 with 5,679 males and 5,501 females and 2,180 households.

History

Manyakheta rose to prominence when the capital of Rashtrakutas was moved from Mayurkhandi in Bidar district to Mānyakheṭa during the rule of Amoghavarsha I. After the fall of the Rāṣṭrakūṭas, it remained the capital of their successors, the Kalyani Chalukyas or Western Chalukyas until about 1050 CE. According to Dhanapāla's Pāiyalacchi, the city was sacked by the Paramāra king Harṣa Sīyaka in CE 972-73, the year he completed that work.

Manyakheta is home to two ancient institutions.

 The Uttaradi Matha of the Dwaita School of philosophy of Madhvacharya. The remains of one of its most prominent saints, Sri Jayatirtha's Brindavana is here. He wrote many commentaries on Madhvacharya's works but was well known for the commentary on celebrated work "Anuvyakhyana" of Madhvacharya which itself is a commentary upon the "Brahma Sutras". For this commentary called Nyaya Sudha, he is popularly known as Teekacharya.
 The Jain Bhattaraka Math. The temple of Neminath (9th century AD). The pillars and walls of the temple date back to between the 9th and 11th centuries. The idols include tirthankaras, choubisi (24 tirthankaras), Nandishwar dvipa and idols of yakshi. There is a famous panchdhatu shrine with 96 images. In the same temple, there are other historical images. The last bhaṭṭāraka of the Malkhed seat who reigned during the year 1950–61, was Bhaṭṭāraka Devendrakīrti.

The famous Mahapurana (Adipurana and Uttarapurana) was composed here by Acharya Jinasena and his pupil Gunabhadra in the 9th century. The mathematics text Ganita Saara Sangraha was written here by Mahaviracharya.

The famous Apabhramsha poet Pushapadanta lived here.

From 814 AD to 968 AD Manyakheta rose to prominence when The capital of Rashtrakutas was moved from Mayurkhandi in Bidar district to Mānyakheṭa during the rule of Amoghavarsha I (Nrupatunga Amoghavarsha), ruled for 64 years and wrote Kavirajamarga the first classical Kannada work. Amoghavarsha I and the scholars mathematician Mahaveeracharya,
and intellectuals Ajitasenacharya, Gunabhadracharya and Jinasenacharya, he helped to spread Jainism. According to Dhanapāla's Pāiyalacchi, the city was sacked by the Paramāra king Harṣa Sīyaka in 972–73 CE, the year he completed that work. In the year 1007 CE, Rajendra Chola destroyed the capital as per inscription in Tanjore Big Temple. After the fall of the Rāṣṭrakūṭas, it remained the capital of their successors, the Kalyani Chalukyas or Western Chalukyas until about 1050 CE. It was later ruled by Kalyani Chalukyas, Southern Kalachuris, Cholas, Yadavas, Kakatiyas, Delhi Sultanate, Bahmani Sultanate, Bidar Sultanate, Bijapur Sultanate, Mughal Empire and Nizam of Hyderabad by 1948.

Economy 

Malkhed is the home to one of the biggest cement factories by name Rajashree Cements owned by the Aditya Birla Group. The village is now developing into a business centre for food grains, dairy and livestock trading . Malkhed has got the biggest livestock trading centre in the entire region. The main crops grown here are mostly rainfed crops like different varieties of pulses pigeonpea, greengram, blackgram. Though water is plenty, it is rarely utilised for agriculture. The masonry here in Malkhed is basically stone masonry and the thatching of the roofs are done by square blocks of stone which are placed in a slanting way so that the rain water gets easily drained off.

Transport
Malkheda is well connected by road and railway. Malkheda lies in State Highway 10. Malkaheda is 40 km southeast to the District Headquarters Kalaburagi district and 18 km west to the Taluk Headquarters Sedam. There is also a railway station near the village, Malkhaid Road.

See also
 Udagi
 Kalaburagi district
 Shorapur
 Basava Kalyana
 Bidar

References

 Dr. Suryanath U. Kamath (2001). A Concise History of Karnataka from pre-historic times to the present, Jupiter books, MCC, Bangalore (Reprinted 2002) OCLC: 7796041

External links
 http://Gulbarga.nic.in/

{{Settlements in Kalaburagi district}}

Jain temples in Karnataka
Western Chalukya Empire
Former capital cities in India
Villages in Kalaburagi district